The men's 50 metre butterfly event at the 2014 Commonwealth Games as part of the swimming programme took place on 24 and 25 July at the Tollcross International Swimming Centre in Glasgow, Scotland.

The medals were presented by Agnes Tjongarero, President of Namibian National Olympic Committee and the quaichs were presented by Raymond Williamson, Lord Dean of Guild of Glasgow.

Records
Prior to this competition, the existing world and Commonwealth Games records were as follows.

The following records were established during the competition:

Results

Heats

Semifinals

Final

References

External links

Men's 050 metre butterfly
Commonwealth Games